Megacorma hoffmani is a moth of the  family Sphingidae. It is known from Papua New Guinea.

References

Acherontiini
Moths described in 2007